"So I Begin" is a song by French house group Galleon. It was released in June 2001 as the lead single from their album Galleon. The song was a hit in the US on radio and in clubs in 2001. It also reached the top 10 in France and in the Flanders region of Belgium.

Music video
The accompanying music video features top model Jitka Ogureková.

Formats and track listings
CD single - Europe (2001)
 "So I Begin" (Radio Edit) - 3:57
 "So I Begin" (Solaris Club Mix) - 8:00
 "So I Begin" (Mandy's Massage Remix) - 7:15
 "So I Begin" (Extended Mix) - 6:12
 "So I Begin" (Classic Club Mix) - 7:35
 "So I Begin" (Hot Uncensored Video) - 4:00

Chart performance

Weekly charts

Year-end charts

Certifications and sales

References

2001 singles
Eurodance songs
English-language French songs
2001 songs